Hassanal Bolkiah National Stadium is a multi-purpose stadium in Bandar Seri Begawan, Brunei. It is currently used mostly for association football matches. The stadium holds 28,000 and was opened on 23 September 1983. It was named after Bruneian Sultan Hassanal Bolkiah.

Construction 
Unusually for a public building in Brunei, members of the public donated and contributed towards the building of the stadium. Although the final collection of $1,102,761.57 accounted for a little more than 1.1 percent of the total building cost ($100 million), the public participation showed the Bruneians' great interest and support for this project. The entire project cost for the stadium is about $100 million.

Building 
It can accommodate 30,000 spectators, which includes 110 seats for the royalties, 500 for the VIPs, and 3,000 in the grandstand section. The parking spaces can accommodate 2,785 private vehicles and 158 buses. The building is oriented in north-south direction with the grandstand located at the western section. It has a football field which fulfills FIFA standards, as well as the running track which fulfills IAAF standards. The stadium has a videomatrix scoreboard located at the northern section; it can display both Latin and Jawi writing.

Opening 
It was opened on 23 September 1983, the date was chosen to celebrate the 69th birthday of Bolkiah's father and predecessor Omar Ali Saifuddien III. On the evening of the opening day, a friendly football match was played between the Brunei national football team and an invited English Football League team, Sheffield United. Despite the jet lag and the humid weather, Sheffield United won 1–0. The next day another match was held between United and a Brunei invited team which ended in a 1–1 draw.

Renovation 
The stadium is currently being renovated since 2021 and was expected to be completed in the middle of 2022. Home matches for the national football team was held at the Track & Field Sports Complex instead.

Major events

1999 
 20th Southeast Asian Games on 7–15 August.

2002 
 Hassanal Bolkiah Trophy on 16–26 August.

2005 
 Hassanal Bolkiah Trophy on 13–25 March.

2007 
 Hassanal Bolkiah Trophy on 3–12 March.

2012 
 Hassanal Bolkiah Trophy on 9–23 August.

2014 
 Hassanal Bolkiah Trophy on 24 February–9 March.

References 

 

Football venues in Brunei Darussalam
Athletics (track and field) venues in Brunei
Brunei
Multi-purpose stadiums
Singapore Premier League venues
DPMM FC
Southeast Asian Games stadiums
Southeast Asian Games athletics venues
Southeast Asian Games football venues